Theodore Laskaris or Lascaris may refer to:

 Theodore I Komnenos Laskaris, Byzantine Nicene emperor from 1205 to 1221
 Theodore II Doukas Laskaris, Byzantine Nicene emperor from 1254 to 1258
Teodoro Láscaris-Comneno (1921–2006), Spanish professor and pretender